Duyun is the capital of Qiannan Buyei and Miao Autonomous Prefecture in Guizhou province in the People's Republic of China.

The area surrounding the city was affected by the Miao rebellion of 1735–36. The city participated in the uprising from the early stages until it was forcefully repressed the following year.

History
Prior to 1949, Duyun was small, but due to economic development in the surrounding area, it became an economic center. It has expanded along the Jian River, becoming several times its previous size.

Administration
Duyun City is divided into 5 subdistricts and 4 towns and 1 Ethnic township. Wenfeng subdistrict is the seat of the Duyun City Government and Duyun City Council.
Subdistricts: Wenfeng, Guanghui, Xiaoweizhai, Shabaopu, Lvyinghu
Towns: Mochong, Pinglang, Maojian, Yundong 
Ethnic townships: Guilan-shui

Climate

Education

Colleges
Qiannan Normal College For Nationalities
Qiannan Medical College For Nationalities
Qiannan Nationality Professional Technology College

Technical school
Duyun vocational technical school

Senior school
Duyun NO.1 Middle School
Duyun NO.2 Middle School
Duyun NO.5 Middle School
Duyun NO.8 Middle School

Middle school
Duyun NO.3 Middle School
Duyun NO.4 Middle School
Duyun NO.6 Middle School
Duyun NO.7 Middle School 
Duyun NO.8 Middle School
Duyun NO.9 Middle School
Duyun NO.10 Middle School
Duyun NO.11 Middle School

Primary school
Duyun NO.1 Primary School
Duyun NO.2 Primary School
Duyun NO.3 Primary School
Duyun NO.4 Primary School
Duyun NO.5 Primary School
Duyun NO.6 Primary School
Duyun NO.7 Primary School
Duyun NO.8 Primary School

Transportation

Road
China National Highway 210
China National Highway 321

Expressway
G76 Xiamen–Chengdu Expressway
Guiyang–Xintianzhai Expressway

Railway
Guiyang–Guangzhou High-Speed Railway, Guiyang–Nanning High-Speed Railway-Duyun East Railway Station
Guizhou-Guangxi Railway-Duyun Railway Station

Airport
The closest airport to Duyun is the Libo Airport located at Libo County.  However, most people still use the large and busy airport in the capital city of Guiyang which is around two hours away.  The Libo Airport has only a few flights per week and limited destinations while the Guiyang Airport has direct connections to most cities of China.

Relative location
Duyun is about 100 km southeast from Guiyang.

References

External links

Cities in Guizhou
Qiannan Buyei and Miao Autonomous Prefecture